Bettada Hoovu is a 1985 Indian Kannada-language film directed by N. Lakshminarayan, based on the Shirley L. Arora's novel What then, Raman?. Produced by Parvathamma Rajkumar, it stars her son Puneeth Rajkumar in the lead role. Puneeth plays Ramu, a young boy born into a poor family, who is fond of reading books, but is forced to discontinue his studies and support his family financially. His performance earned him the National Film Award for Best Child Artist. Deccan Herald rated the film number one among the best "children's movies in Kannada". The film won three Filmfare Awards South.

Plot 
Ramu is a young boy born into a poor family, living with his parents and two siblings in a hill station. His parents hardly make ends meet; mother working as a fruit- and vegetable-seller, and father running errands in and around the village, often as a help to the visiting tourists. However, Ramu likes reading his books and going to the school. He even friendship with a healthcare worker, who teaches him English after school. He is fascinated after watching a screening of the film Sri Ramanjaneya Yuddha in his village and also upon seeing Kuvempu's Sri Ramayana Darshanam at a bookstore, both based on the epic Ramayana, and wishes to buy the latter to read. Costing 10, he begins working towards it.

Due to an off-season when tourists return home, Ramu's family situation becomes dire and his father has to move to the city in search of work, leaving the responsibility of managing the family to young Ramu. Ramu is now forced to drop out of school to and to earn for his family. He starts doing little chores around the village, while saving a part of his earnings towards buying the book. He begins selling wildflowers to an American teacher, who is writing a book on Indian wildflowers. He earns ten rupees, enough to buy the book, when he brings an orchid flower to the teacher. However, when he goes to buy the book, he has a rethink. He has to make a decision between buying the book or a blanket to comfort his family members from the chilling winter cold. In the end, he decides to get the blanket, much to the happiness of his family. But then his dream of buying the book is shattered.

Cast 
 Puneeth Rajkumar as Ramu (credited as Master Puneeth)
 Padma Vasanthi as Parvati, Ramu's mother
 Marcia Jamal as a teacher
 Roopadevi as a healthcare worker (cameo)
 Mohan Kumar as Chinnappa, Ramu's father (credited as Aalemane Mohan Kumar)
 Balakrishna as Doddajja
 Shivaprakash
 Sadashiva Brahmavar as Muthanna, shopkeeper
 Shankanada Aravind as Somanna (credited as Anubhava Aravind)
 Honnavalli Krishna as Linganna
 Kunigal Ramanath
 B. Ramamurthy
 Vijay Raghavendra (credited as Master Vijaya Raghava)
 Savitha as Vasanthi, Ramu's sister (credited as Baby Savitha)

Soundtrack 
The music was composed by Rajan–Nagendra.

 "Patte Huli Balu Ketta Huli" – C. Aswath
 "Bisile Irali Maleye Barali" – S. P. Balasubrahmanyam, Master Puneeth
 "Thaayi Sharade" – Master Puneeth,  P. B. Sreenivas

Awards 
National Film Awards – 1985
 Best Kannada Film — Parvathamma Rajkumar
 Best Child Actor – Puneeth Rajkumar

1984–85 Karnataka State Film Awards
 Second Best Film — Parvathamma Rajkumar
 Best Story Writer – Shirley L. Arora

Filmfare Awards South
Best Film - Kannada - Parvathamma Rajkumar
Best Director - Kannada -  N. Lakshminarayan
Special Award Best Child Actor - Puneeth Rajkumar

References

External links 
 

1980s Kannada-language films
1985 films
Films scored by Rajan–Nagendra
Indian children's films
Films based on Indian novels
Best Kannada Feature Film National Film Award winners
Indian drama films
Films directed by N. Lakshminarayan